A number of places are named after the tenth guru of Sikhs, Guru Gobind Singh .

India

Bihar
 Guru Gobind Singh Hospital, Patna Sahib (Bihar)
 Sri Guru Gobind Singh College, Patna

Chandigarh
 Shri Guru Gobind Singh College, Chandigarh
 Guru Gobind Singh College for Women, Chandigarh

Delhi
 Guru Gobind Singh Indraprastha University, New Delhi
 Sri Guru Gobind Singh College of Commerce, New Delhi
 Kalgidhar National Public Senior Secondary School, New Delhi
 Guru gobind Singh Marg, Delhi

Gujarat
 Guru Gobind Singh Hospital, Jamnagar, Gujarat, India

Haryana
 Shree Guru Gobind Singh Tricentenary University, Gurgaon
 Guru Gobind Singh College of Pharmacy, Yamunanagar
 Guru Gobind Singh Government Polytechnic, Cheeka

Himachal Pradesh
 Kalgidhar Trust, Baru Sahib (Himachal Pradesh)
 Gobind Sagar, a man-made reservoir situated in Bilaspur District, Himachal Pradesh.

Jharkhand
 Guru Gobind Singh Educational Society's Technical Campus, Kandra (v) Chas Bokaro Steel City, Jharkhand-827013

Karnatka
 Guru Gobind Singh College, Bangalore (Karnatka)

Madhya Pradesh
 Guru Gobind Singh Khalsa Higher Secondary School -(GGSKHSS) is a secondary school located in Jabalpur, Madhya Pradesh, India.
 Guru Gobind Singh Khalsa School, Jabalpur
 Shri Guru Gobind Singh Law College, Indore

Maharashtra
 Guru Gobind singh Endowment Chair for Research in Sikhism, (History Deptt. - Mumbai University)
 Shri Guru Gobind Singh Ji Airport, Hazur Sahib, Nanded
 Guru Gobind Singh Stadium, Nanded
 Guru Gobind singh Marg, Mulund Colony, Mumbai
 Guru Gobind Singh Industrial Estate, Goregaon (E), Mumbai
 Guru Gobind singh Foundation, Nasik
 Guru Gobind Singh Educational Institute in Kamptee Road, Nagpur
 Shri Guru Gobind Singhji (SGGS) Institute of Engineering and Technology, Nanded
 Guru Gobind Singh College of Engineering & Research Centre, Nasik
 Shri Guru Gobind Singhji Institute of Engineering and Technology, Nanded
 Guru Gobind Singh Polytechnic, Nasik
 Guru Gobind Singh Polytechnic, Nasik

Punjab
 Guru Gobind singh Study Circle, Ludhiana (UNESCO Peace Award Winner)
 Guru Gobind Singh Super Thermal Power Plant
 Guru Gobind Singh Marg
 Guru Gobind Singh Medical College, Faridkot
 Guru Gobind Singh Refinery, Phulokheri, Bathinda
 Guru Gobind Singh Bhawan, Punjabi University, Patiala
 Guru Gobind Singh Stadium, Jalandhar
 Mandi Gobindgarh, steel town of Punjab, India
 GGS College of Modern Technology, Kharar
 Guru Gobind Singh College Of Engineering & Technology, Talwandi Sabo, Bathinda
 Guru Gobind Singh College, Sanghera
 Guru Gobind Singh College of Education (For Women), Giddarbaha
 Guru Gobind Singh Polytechnic College, Handowal Kalan
 Kalgidhar Institute of Higher Education, Malout
 Trai Shatabdi Guru Gobind Singh Khalsa College, Amritsar

Uttar Pradesh
 Guru Gobind Singh Sports College, Lucknow

Other countries

Canada
 Guru Gobind Singh Children's Foundation

England
 Gobind Marg, a street in Bradford, West Yorkshire, UK Where the Guru Gobind Singh Gurdwara is situated (1)
 Guru Gobind Singh Khalsa College, Chigwell, Essex, England

United States
 Guru Gobind Singh Sikh Center, Plainview, New York, United States
 Guru Gobind Singh Foundation, North Potomac, Maryland, United States of America

References

External links
 https://web.archive.org/web/20130522054752/http://sggscollege.ac.in/
 Guru Gobind Singh Bhawan @YouTube
GGSIPU, New Delhi
GGSCC, New Delhi
Guru Gobind Singh Marg
1 - Gobind Marg, Bradford

Sikhism-related lists
Monuments and memorials in India
Memorials to Guru Gobind Singh
Singh, Guru Gobind